Jo Song-nam (born 30 October 1957) is a North Korean sports shooter. He competed in the mixed 50 metre running target event at the 1980 Summer Olympics.

References

1957 births
Living people
North Korean male sport shooters
Olympic shooters of North Korea
Shooters at the 1980 Summer Olympics
Place of birth missing (living people)